398th may refer to:

398th Air Expeditionary Group, provisional United States Air Force unit assigned to the United States Air Forces in Europe
398th Bombardment Squadron, inactive United States Air Force unit last assigned with the 92d Operations Group at Fairchild Air Force Base, Washington
398th Fighter-Interceptor Squadron, inactive United States Air Force unit, last assigned to the Air Defense Command stationed at Hamilton AFB, California

See also
398 (number)
398, the year 398 (CCCXCVIII) of the Julian calendar
398 BC